Riverdale Township may refer to:

 Riverdale Township, Kossuth County, Iowa
 Riverdale Township, Watonwan County, Minnesota
 Riverdale Township, Buffalo County, Nebraska
 Riverdale Township, Dickey County, North Dakota, in Dickey County, North Dakota

Township name disambiguation pages